Jaroslav Kollinger (13 December 1905 – 24 July 1949) was a Czech gymnast. He competed in eight events at the 1936 Summer Olympics.

References

External links
 

1905 births
1949 deaths
Czech male artistic gymnasts
Olympic gymnasts of Czechoslovakia
Gymnasts at the 1936 Summer Olympics
People from Roudnice nad Labem
Sportspeople from the Ústí nad Labem Region